is a third-person shooter video game developed by Yuke's and published by D3 Publisher for the PlayStation 4. It is a spin-off of the Earth Defense Force series, similar to Earth Defense Force: Insect Armageddon, geared more toward Western audiences with a more serious tone compared to the main series by Sandlot. A Japanese release date was initially set for late 2018, but the game was delayed into 2019. It was released simultaneously worldwide on April 11, 2019.

Gameplay

Like previous entries in the series, Earth Defense Force: Iron Rain is a third-person action shooting game, where the player takes control of an Earth Defense Force (EDF) soldier and battles an onslaught of alien enemies. The game features four soldier classes, the Trooper, Jet Lifter, Heavy Striker, and Prowl Rider, all of which feature the option to play as a male or female soldier. The game uses the same type of ammo system as other EDF games, with most weapons having no ammunition limit and only limited by reloading times. Enemies drop Energy Gems, which can be picked up to power the player's Energy Core. Energy Gems also serve as the in-game currency, which the player collects during missions and can subsequently use to purchase new weapons or apparel for the playable character. On some missions, the enemy Kindred Rebellion faction may enter the combat area to try to loot Energy Gems dropped by fallen Aggressors. While the Rebellion will attack Aggressors, it is also hostile toward the EDF.

In addition to a campaign consisting of 52 total missions, Earth Defense Force: Iron Rain includes multiple online game modes. Players can play the co-op campaign online with up to five other players, or engage in the PvP "Mercenary Mode," where two teams of four compete to collect the most Energy Gems. One team is the EDF, while the other is the Kindred Rebellion, and both battle against waves of Aggressors and the other team to collect all dropped Energy Gems. Two-player split-screen gameplay is also available for the offline campaign.

Reception

Earth Defense Force: Iron Rain has an aggregate score of 69 on Metacritic based on 49 reviews.

Notes

References

2019 video games
D3 Publisher games
Earth Defense Force
Multiplayer and single-player video games
PlayStation 4 games
Third-person shooters
Unreal Engine games
Video games developed in Japan
Video games scored by Akari Kaida
Windows games
Yuke's games